General elections were held in Jordan on 8 November 1993, the first in which political parties were allowed to run since 1956. Independents won 60 of the 80 seats, with the Islamic Action Front emerging as the largest party, winning 17 seats. Voter turnout was 55%.

Electoral system
The election was held using single non-transferable voting, with each voter casting one vote in multiple-member district.

Results

References

Elections in Jordan
1993 in Jordan
Jordan
Election and referendum articles with incomplete results
November 1993 events in Asia